The Mono Polys were an English indie pop band, formed in Colchester in 2012 by vocalist and guitarist Tom Knights and keyboardist Josh Harrison. The band was later expanded to include brothers Luke Vosper on bass and Isaac Vosper on drums. Knights and Harrison had previously been a member of Red Fentre, who had performed at a Sixth Form College battle of the bands competition at Colchester Arts Centre, and later changed their name to Broken Bottles.

The band were supported and managed by Mark Pearman, a TV Executive at Sky Sports whose daughter introduced Knights in early 2012. It was announced on the band's Facebook page on 11 January 2015 that founder Josh Harrison was leaving the band to "pursue other musical interests".

Knights had begun another project initially under the name Hostage, which then became Obsess in December 2014 and by January 2016, Knights had formed a new band 'Lunar Quiet' in Brighton and was also being advised by former Food Records executive and Blur manager David Balfe as to his future plans regarding his work.

Knights committed suicide following "mental health issues that he could no longer cope with", in Brighton on 22 October 2016, aged 22. A cassette single by 'Lunar Quiet' titled Cold Spell was released posthumously in memory of Knights and also included a fanzine and A4 poster. A memorial gig took place on 14 December 2016 at the Green Door Store venue in Brighton, with the likes of local bands Morning Smoke, Beachtape and Eyesaw performing and attendees asked to make a donation to Colchester Samaritans.

History

Pavilion (2012)
Knights and Harrison had collaborated prior to the formation of The Mono Polys as part of Colchester-based four-piece Red Fenetre. Following their departure from the band, they formed The Mono Polys in February 2012 at Colchester 6th form college, releasing their debut EP Life the next month.

Between April and September 2012, Knights and Harrison toured parts of East Anglia, supporting The Libertines drummer Gary Powell before returning to Essex to record their debut album, Pavilion. The download version of the album, released on 31 November 2012, featured an acoustic version of "Summertime" produced by Joel Stoker of The Rifles. The rest of the album was produced by the band's manager.

Blossom (2013)
After receiving airplay on BBC Radio 2 and BBC Radio 6 Music, Luke and Isaac Vosper joined the band in early 2013. As a four-piece, the band then embarked on a 5-month tour, supporting Tom Hingley (Inspiral Carpets). In an interview with Darkus Magazine, Luke Vosper explained: "I met Josh at college and we got talking about music. He mentioned that his band was looking for a bassist, so he and Tom came round to try a few ideas out. Things didn’t really click at first so we got my little brother Isaac in to play drums and straight away it worked. We then had 2 weeks to learn a 17 song set for our first 4 piece gig." 2013 ended with the band supporting Carl Barât alongside Reverend and The Makers and The Rifles at London's Vibe Bar for New Year's Eve.

Joel Stoker later returned to help the band produce their second EP, Blossom, which was released 25 January 2014 and received its debut airplay on Soccer AM. The EP was received well abroad and benefited from BBC Radio airplay in England. In the Netherlands, 'Insomnia' reached #1 in the Free 40 Alternative Chart in March.

Identity (2014–present)
The band began recording tracks for a new EP in August 2014, and were soon after featured in Loaded magazine. Although they expected to have a third EP ready by the end of the year, with the departure of Harrison, the release was delayed until 2015. In April 2015, the band announced on Facebook their plans to release Identity in May, along with two London tour dates and a slot at The Alternative Escape Festival, part of The Great Escape Festival. During the Mono Polys short existence, they played approx 80 gigs around the country including Exeter, Cardiff, Bristol, Poole, Brighton, Birmingham, Stoke, Manchester, Nottingham and London and had national radio airplay on BBC Radio. The band's manager had described their sound as "suicide pop", with the band joking that the third EP would be titled "The Twenty Guilty Pleasures of Suicide Pop".

Discography

Studio albums
Pavilion (31 November 2012, INC-JEN Records)

EPs
Life (12 March 2012, INC-JEN Records)
Blossom (25 January 2014, INC-JEN Records)
Identity (30 May 2015, INC-JEN Records)

References

British indie pop groups
Musical groups established in 2012
Musical groups from Essex
2012 establishments in England